Major General James Robert Chiswell,  (born 29 March 1964) is a former British Army officer.

Early life and education
Born in Berlin to Major General Peter Chiswell, James Chiswell was educated at Allhallows College and King's College London.

Military career
Chiswell was commissioned into the Parachute Regiment in 1983. He took part in Operation Barras in Sierra Leone in September 2000 for which he was awarded the Military Cross.

Chiswell became Commanding officer of 2nd Battalion, Parachute Regiment in 2004 and led his battalion in Iraq. He was then sent to Permanent Joint Headquarters, Northwood as Assistant Chief of Staff with responsibility for current operations. He went on to be Liaison Officer to the Joint Chiefs of Staff in Washington, D.C. in 2008 and Commander of 16 Air Assault Brigade in December 2008 seeing service as Commander Task Force Helmand when the brigade was deployed to Afghanistan in October 2010. Chiswell was appointed Commander of the Order of the British Empire in September 2011 in recognition of his service in Afghanistan. He became General Officer Commanding 1st Armoured Division in October 2012 and Director Special Forces in 2015. Chiswell was appointed Companion of the Order of the Bath in the 2018 Birthday Honours. Chiswell retired from the British Army on 22 September 2018.

Personal life
Chiswell married Linda Metcalf in 2006; they have one son.

References

|-

Living people
1964 births
People educated at Allhallows College
Alumni of King's College London
British Army major generals
Commanders of the Order of the British Empire
Recipients of the Military Cross
British Parachute Regiment officers
British Army personnel of the War in Afghanistan (2001–2021)
Companions of the Order of the Bath